Tommy Pistol (born July 2, 1976) is the stage name of American adult film actor and director Aramis Sartorio. He is known for his porn parody work, most notably as the lead actor in Evil Head, Pee-Wee's XXX Adventure: A Porn Parody, Taxi Driver: A XXX Parody, and Suicide Squad: An Axel Braun Parody.

Career
Pistol started his career in Queens, New York, as a stage actor with sketch comedy group Cheese Theater, with whom he acted for more than a decade. He also appeared in several short and feature films. Pistol was also once a singer for the metalcore band AmoreA.

He entered the pornography business in late 2005, after meeting with Joanna Angel, founder of the alt-porn company Burning Angel; this led to Pistol becoming the first male performer on BurningAngel.com. Angel was also responsible for choosing the moniker Tommy Pistol, after nixing A-Mac, Pistol's original name idea. Credited under his given name, Pistol wrote, directed, and portrayed the title role in the 2010 independent horror-comedy film The Gruesome Death of Tommy Pistol; he also performed as DJ Tommy Pistol on the film's soundtrack. Pistol continued to direct, and in 2013, he directed the feature horror-porn Beyond Fucked: A Zombie Odyssey. In 2014, Pistol won AVN's Best Actor Award for his role as Ash Williams in Burning Angel's Evil Head, the porn parody of the Evil Dead franchise. Pistol went on to star as The Joker in Axel Braun's Suicide Squad: An Axel Braun Parody, and other lead roles, including his 2018 AVN Best Actor Win for Ingenue.

In 2015, Pistol became the first male performer in twenty years to host the annual AVN Awards in Las Vegas, Nevada, alongside Alexis Texas.

Pistol has made several appearances under his given name in independent films, including Bethany, Jurassic City, and the lead role in Frankie in Blunderland. Since 2016, he has participated in the annual WIH Massive Blood Drive PSA, a collaboration between the international grassroots initiative Women in Horror Month and Twisted Twin Productions.

Pistol enjoyed mainstream recognition when his minor role as "The Cook" in Brazzers' Tatas Under Siege: An XXX Parody went viral on Twitter. Pistol has also been featured on BuzzFeed, Uproxx, and most recently, Elle.com, after a tweet mocking Donald Trump was liked by Trump's daughter, Ivanka.

In September 2022, Canadian horror directors the Soska Sisters announced the premiere of their new film On the Edge, co-starring Pistol, to take place at the London FrightFest Halloween festival on October 29. The film was shot and produced in Canada and also co-stars Jen Soska, Sylvia Soska and Mackenzie Gray. The festival synopsis of the film reads, "Family man Peter gets more than he paid for when he books a 36-hour session with the sadistic Mistress Satana who seems more intent on making him suffer for his sins. Is it blackmail? Is it torture? Or is it the Devil come for his soul? Will Peter’s faith save him from his own personal Hell or is he already damned? A brilliant depiction of how Kink Culture can heal past trauma and be a source for shocking redemption."

Personal life
Pistol was born in Queens, New York.

Awards
 2006 AVN Award – Most Outrageous Sex Scene (Re-Penetrator) with Joanna Angel
 2007 AVN Award – Best New Male Performer
 2012 XBIZ Award – Male Acting Performance of the Year-Male (Taxi Driver XXX)
 2014 XBIZ Award – Best Supporting Actor (The Temptation of Eve)
 2014 AVN Award – Best Actor (Evil Head) 
 2015 XBIZ Award – Best Actor – Parody Release (Not the Jersey Boys XXX)
 2015 XBIZ Award – Best Scene – Parody Release (American Hustle XXX) with Aaliyah Love
 2016 XBIZ Award – Best Actor – Couples-Themed Release (Wild Inside)
 2017 XBIZ Award – Best Actor – Parody Release (Suicide Squad XXX: An Axel Braun Parody)
 2019 XBIZ Award – Best Actor – Feature Movie (Anne: A Taboo Parody (PureTaboo/Gamma Films))
 2019 XBIZ Award – Best Actor – Couples-Themed Release (The Weight of Infidelity (PureTaboo/Gamma Films))
 2020 AVN Award – Best Supporting Actor – The Gang Makes a Porno: A DP XXX Parody
 2022 AVN Award – Male Performer of the Year
 2022 AVN Award – Best Leading Actor
 2022 AVN Award – Best Supporting Actor

Partial filmography 
 "Tatas Under Siege" (2012) – The Cook
 A Wet Dream on Elm Street (2011) – Professor
 Taxi Driver: A XXX Parody (2011) – Travis Bickle
 Psycho Sleepover (2008) 
 Horat: The Sexual Learnings of America for Make Benefit Beautiful Nation of Kaksuckistan (2008)- Horat
 Evil Head (2007) - Ashley J. Williams
 The Bad Luck Betties (2007)
 The XXXorcist (2006) – Father Merkin
 Avenue X (2006)
 Skater Girl Fever (2006)
 Debbie Does Dallas Again – himself
 Suicide Squad XXX: An Axel Braun Parody (2016) - The Joker
 The Gang Makes a Porno: A DP XXX Parody (2018) - Narly

References

External links
 
 
 
 
 
 profile at Burning Angel 

1976 births
Living people
People from Queens, New York
American male pornographic film actors
Pornographic film actors from New York (state)
American pornographic film directors
American parodists
Parody film directors
Film directors from New York City